The 1989–90 OB I bajnokság season was the 53rd season of the OB I bajnokság, the top level of ice hockey in Hungary. Seven teams participated in the league, and Lehel SE Jaszbereny won the championship.

Regular season

Playoffs

5th place 
 Alba Volán Székesfehérvár - Nepstadion Sz.E. Budapest 2:0 (6:2, 4:2)

3rd place 
 Újpesti Dózsa SC - Miskolci Kinizsi 3:0 (22:6, 10:6, 7:3 abg.)

Final
 Lehel SE Jászberény - Ferencvárosi TC 3:1 (8:1, 4:5, 8:3, 4:1)

External links
 Season on hockeyarchives.info

1989-90
Hun
OB